Sebastian Maniscalco (born July 8, 1973) is an American stand-up comedian and actor. He has released five comedy specials. Maniscalco has also had supporting acting roles in the films Green Book (2018) and The Irishman (2019), playing mobster Joe Gallo in the latter.

Early life
Maniscalco was born on July 8, 1973, in the Chicago suburb of Arlington Heights, Illinois, to Italian immigrants; his father Salvatore Maniscalco, who worked as a hairstylist, immigrated to the United States with his family from Cefalù, Sicily, at the age of 15. His mother Rose Maniscalco was a secretary, and her family has origins in Naples, Campania and Sicily. Maniscalco is a Roman Catholic, and at eight years old, he was an altar boy at St. Cecilia Catholic Church in suburban Mount Prospect, Illinois. He is an alum of Rolling Meadows High School. He graduated from Northern Illinois University in 1995, where he was the president of the Sigma Pi fraternity chapter, with a degree in communication studies. After moving to Los Angeles in 1998, Maniscalco performed at open mics in bars and bowling alleys while working as a waiter at the Four Seasons Hotel in Beverly Hills, California, where he worked from 1998 to 2005.

Career
In 2005, he began performing regularly at The Comedy Store in West Hollywood, California. Maniscalco cites Jerry Seinfeld, George Carlin, Brian Regan, John Ritter, Johnny Carson, Andrew Dice Clay, Bill Burr, and Don Rickles as comedic influences. Since then, he has done a half-hour for Comedy Central Presents and five hour-long specials. His first special, Sebastian Live, was released on June 2, 2009. His next three specials were aired on Showtime, with What's Wrong with People? released on January 5, 2012, Aren't You Embarrassed?, taped in Chicago, released on November 14, 2014, and Why Would You Do That?, taped in New York City and released in 2016.

Maniscalco was one of four comedians featured in Vince Vaughn's Wild West Comedy Show: 30 Days & 30 Nights – Hollywood to the Heartland, along with Ahmed Ahmed, John Caparulo, and Bret Ernst. Maniscalco has been on Russell Peters' Best Night Ever, Comedy Central Presents, The Late Late Show with Craig Ferguson, The Tonight Show with Jay Leno, The Jay Leno Show, The Tonight Show Starring Jimmy Fallon, Conan, and The Late Show with Stephen Colbert. Additionally, he appeared in several films, such as The Nut Job 2: Nutty by Nature, The House, Tag, and Cruise, and he co-hosts a podcast titled The Pete and Sebastian Show with fellow comedian Pete Correale. As of January 2017, they have a show on Sirius XM satellite radio's Raw Dog Comedy channel 99. In 2016, Maniscalco appeared on the seventh season of Comedians in Cars Getting Coffee. He published his memoir Stay Hungry on February 27, 2018. A Netflix special also titled Stay Hungry was released on January 15, 2019.

In 2018, Maniscalco made his feature film debut, as Johnny Venere in the Academy Award-winning film Green Book. Maniscalco hosted the 2019 MTV Video Music Awards on August 26. In November 2019, Maniscalco appeared in Martin Scorsese's The Irishman playing "Crazy" Joe Gallo alongside Robert De Niro, Joe Pesci, and Al Pacino. He also hosted the three-part companion podcast for the film, first published on December 2, 2019, titled Behind the Irishman.

In June 2021, it was announced that Maniscalco will host a reality television show titled Well Done With Sebastian Maniscalco that premiered on August 12, 2021 on Discovery+ where he will be joined by friends and family to explore food culture and etiquette. Four days after the premiere, the show was renewed for a six-episode second season that will premiere on November 16, 2021. In August 2021, during a podcast, he announced that he was a part of the cast of Illumination's The Super Mario Bros. Movie, playing the role of Spike from the game Wrecking Crew as Mario and Luigi's boss.

Maniscalco's 5th comedy special, Is It Me?, released on December 6, 2022 on Netflix.

Comedic style

He is known for his "nostalgia" type of humor grounded in personal family experiences. Most of his material riffs on being raised in an old-school environment with an immigrant father, or just expressing his amazement at people's outlandish behavior. Maniscalco says that comedy cannot be learned, it must be earned. It took him nearly 20 years to develop his "Can you believe this?" style of humor. He explained, "you don't become a bodybuilder the first day you start lifting weights. Same thing with comedy. You gotta flesh out your joke, your bit. You add and subtract. You see what works."

Personal life
Maniscalco married Lana Gomez in August 2013. The couple have two children together: a daughter born in 2017, and a son born in 2019.

Filmography

Comedy specials

Film

Television

References

External links
 
 

1973 births
Living people
21st-century American comedians
American stand-up comedians
American male comedians
Comedians from Illinois
Male actors from Chicago
21st-century American male actors
American male film actors
American male television actors
American male voice actors
People from Arlington Heights, Illinois
Northern Illinois University alumni
American Roman Catholics
American people of Italian descent